North Mamm Peak is a prominent mountain summit on Grand Mesa in the Rocky Mountains of North America.

Mountain

Historical names
North Mam Peak
North Mamm Peak – 1963

See also

List of Colorado mountain ranges
List of Colorado mountain summits
List of Colorado fourteeners
List of Colorado 4000 meter prominent summits
List of the most prominent summits of Colorado
List of Colorado county high points

References

External links

Mountains of Colorado
Mountains of Garfield County, Colorado
White River National Forest
North American 3000 m summits